Dietrich IV may refer to:

 Dietrich IV, Count of Cleves (ruled 1188–1198)
 Theodoric IV of Isenburg-Kempenich (ruled until 1329)